"Rapture" is a song by American rock band Blondie from their fifth studio album Autoamerican (1980). Written by band members Debbie Harry and Chris Stein, and produced by Mike Chapman, the song was released as the second and final single from Autoamerican on January 12, 1981, by Chrysalis Records. Musically, "Rapture" is a combination of new wave, disco and hip hop with a rap section forming an extended coda.

"Rapture" was another commercial success for the band, shipping one million copies in the United States, where it was certified Gold by the Recording Industry Association of America (RIAA) and spent two weeks at number one on the Billboard Hot 100, their fourth and last single to reach the top ten. It was the first number-one single in the United States to feature rap vocals. The single also peaked at number three in Canada, and number five in Australia and the United Kingdom.

Background
Singer Debbie Harry and guitarist Chris Stein were friends with Brooklyn- and Bronx-based hip-hop artists such as Fab 5 Freddy Brathwaite in the late 1970s. Brathwaite took Harry and Stein to a rap event in the Bronx one night in 1978, and they were both impressed by the skill and excitement as MCs rhymed lyrics over the beats of spinning records and people lined up for a chance to take the microphone and freestyle rap. Harry and Stein went to a few more such events, before deciding to write a rap song of their own in late 1979. They decided to combine what they had seen and heard in the Bronx with Chic-inspired disco music. Keyboardist Jimmy Destri found some tubular bells in the back of the studio, which added a haunting touch to the song. The title "Rapture" was an obvious pun on rap, according to Stein.

In an early recording the music was slower and simpler. Stein said that "[t]he slower tape was just bass, drums and guitar doubling the bass, I don’t think much else.". This version was put aside and later reworked as "Rapture". For "Rapture", Stein said that "[w]e decided to make it faster." Stein later retrieved the original recording, and Harry and Braithwaite added vocals. The result was released in the UK as "Yuletide Throwdown", as a flexi disc given away with the magazine Flexipop.

Stein loved B-movies and science fiction imagery, so he wrote some surreal verses about a man from Mars. For the chorus, Harry tried to capture the feeling of a crowded hip-hop dance floor in the Bronx: "Toe to toe / Dancing very close / Barely breathing / Almost comatose / Wall to wall / People hypnotized / And they're stepping lightly / Hang each night in Rapture." They also referenced their friend Fab 5 Freddy, as well as Grandmaster Flash. The song was the first major hip-hop song to use original music, rather than samples.

Record World said that "Debbie's sweet, enticing vocal transforms itself into a streetwise jam," calling the song "infectious" and calling the rhythm "hypnotic."

Music video
The accompanying music video for "Rapture" made its US television debut on Solid Gold on January 31, 1981, and not only became the first rap video ever broadcast on MTV, but was part of its first 90-video rotation. Set in the East Village section of Manhattan, the "Man from Mars" or "voodoo god" (dancer William Barnes in the white suit and top hat) is the introductory and central figure. Barnes also choreographed the piece. Much of the video is a one-take scene of lead singer Debbie Harry dancing down the street, passing by graffiti artists, Uncle Sam, an Indigenous American, child ballet dancer and a goat. Fab Five Freddy and graffiti artists Lee Quiñones and Jean-Michel Basquiat make cameo appearances. Basquiat was hired when Grandmaster Flash did not show for the shoot.
The UK 7" version of the song is used in the video.

Versions
The versions appearing on the US and UK 7" and 12" singles were quite different. The US 7" single, also issued with a different cover picture, used the original album version and the US 12" single used a version with an additional verse, making it 40 seconds longer. For the UK and other market single releases, producer Mike Chapman remixed the track completely. The "Special Disco Mix" has a different introduction, a longer instrumental break with new percussion overdubbed and includes the extra verse, making it 10 minutes long. The UK 7" version (4:59) was an edit of the "Special Disco Mix" without the extra verse. A slightly different edit with the extra verse (5:36) appeared on the band's first greatest hits compilation The Best of Blondie (1981). The album track "Live It Up" was also extended and remixed for the B-side of the non-US 12" single. This 8-minute version was included on the 1994 UK CD edition of Autoamerican and was reissued as part of EMI's 15-disc Blondie Singles Box in 2004. The song is widely regarded as one of Blondie's best; in 2017, Billboard ranked the song number two on their list of the 10 greatest Blondie songs, and in 2021, The Guardian ranked the song number seven on their list of the 20 greatest Blondie songs.

Blondie re-recorded the song for their 2014 compilation album Greatest Hits Deluxe Redux. The compilation was part of a 2-disc set called Blondie 4(0) Ever which included their tenth studio album Ghosts of Download and marked the 40th anniversary of the forming of the band.

The picture of Debbie Harry used for the UK editions of the original 7" and 12" "Rapture" singles was later used for the cover of the compilation album Beautiful: The Remix Album (1995).

Remixes
Other than the original remixes from 1981, the first official remix of "Rapture" can be found on the compilation album Once More into the Bleach (1988). The track was remixed again and re-issued as a single in both the UK and the US in 1994, this time peaking at number eight on the US Dance Club Songs chart. This remix was included on the compilations The Platinum Collection (1994), Beautiful: The Remix Album (1995) and Remixed Remade Remodeled: The Remix Project (1995).

Rapture Riders
In 2005, "Rapture" was mashed with The Doors' 1971 song "Riders on the Storm" into "Rapture Riders" by Go Home Productions. This unofficial mashup remix was later approved by both bands and released as a single credited to Blondie vs. The Doors. It was also included on Blondie's compilation album Greatest Hits: Sight + Sound (2005). "Rapture Riders" made the top-ten on the US Dance Club Songs and was a Top 40 hit in Australia and Europe.

Covers and sampling
Grandmaster Flash scratch mixed "Rapture" on his single "The Adventures of Grandmaster Flash on the Wheels of Steel" and also included the track on his DJ mix album Essential Mix: Classic Edition (2002), editing out all the rap parts.

KRS-One used a tonally similar version of the intro to "Rapture" for the intro/chorus of his single "Step Into A World (Rapture's Delight)" with lyrics changed slightly to praise KRS-One's rap prowess.

A soft-jazz instrumental cover version can be heard during the New Year's Eve party scene in Paul Mazursky's 1982 film Tempest.

To promote the character's appearances in the third season of The Boys, Jensen Ackles appeared in several videos depicting Soldier Boy's in-universe promotional campaigns in the 1980s, in particular, serenading the dancers of Solid Gold with a spoken-word rendition of "Rapture".
Ackles' cover received additional praise from the band itself, with original singer Debbie Harry describing the rendition as "epic".

Credits and personnel
Debbie Harry – vocals
Clem Burke – drums
Jimmy Destri – electric keyboards
Nigel Harrison – bass
Frank Infante – guitar
Chris Stein – guitar, timpani
Tom Scott – saxophone

Track listing and formats
US 7"  (CHS 2485, January 1981)
"Rapture" (Album version) (Deborah Harry, Chris Stein) – 6:33
"Walk Like Me" (Jimmy Destri) – 3:45

US 12"  (12 CHS 2485, January 1981)
"Rapture" (US 12" Mix) (Harry, Stein) – 7:13
"Walk Like Me" (Destri) – 3:45

UK 7"  (CHS 2485, January 1981)
"Rapture" (UK 7" Mix) (Harry, Stein) – 4:59
"Walk Like Me" (Destri) – 3:45

UK 12"  (CHS 12 2485, January 1981)
"Rapture" (Special Disco Mix) (Harry, Stein) – 10:01
"Live It Up" (Stein) (Special Disco Mix) – 8:14

US 1994 Remix CD (7243 8 85277 2 3)
"Rapture" (K-klassic Radio Mix) – 4:20
"Rapture" (Original Single Version) – 4:57
"Rapture" (Guru's Fly Party Mix) – 4:11
"Rapture" (K-klassic Mix) – 7:07
"Rapture" (Original Disco Mix) – 10:00 *
"Rapture" (Pharmacy Dub) – 6:00
"Rapture" (Phactory Beats) – 4:22
"Call Me" (American Gigolo Version) – 8:04

* Identical to the original Special Disco Mix.

Rapture Riders
CD (0946 3475502 3)
"Rapture Riders" (Single Edit) – 3:50 	
"Rapture Riders" (Full Version) – 5:41 	
"Rapture" (7" Version) – 4:57 	
"Rapture" (Special Disco Mix) (2001 Remaster) – 9:59

12" (347 550 1)
"Rapture Riders" (Full Version) – 5:41 	 	
"Rapture" (Special Disco Mix) (2001 Remaster) – 9:59

Charts

Weekly charts

Year-end charts

Certifications

See also
 List of Billboard Hot 100 number-one singles of the 1980s

References

External links
 
 Rapture Songfacts entry

1981 singles
Blondie (band) songs
Billboard Hot 100 number-one singles
Cashbox number-one singles
Songs written by Debbie Harry
Songs written by Chris Stein
Song recordings produced by Mike Chapman
Chrysalis Records singles
1980 songs
Macaronic songs
American hip hop songs